Saint-Aubin-des-Châteaux is a commune in the Loire-Atlantique department in western France.

Geography
The village is located in the northwestern part of the commune on the right bank of the river Chère, which flows southwest through the commune.

Population

See also
Communes of the Loire-Atlantique department

References

Communes of Loire-Atlantique